The following outline is provided as an overview of and topical guide to the Wars of Scottish Independence:

Wars of Scottish Independence – A series of military campaigns fought from 12961357 by the Kingdom of Scotland to maintain their nation's independence from the Kingdom of England.

Background
The following events can be seen as leading to the Wars of Scottish Independence:
 Death of Alexander III of Scotland - 19 March 1286
 Death of Margaret, Maid of Norway - September 1290 - left no clear heir to the throne of Scotland.
 Competitors for the Crown of Scotland - 13 individuals claiming the throne of Scotland. Edward I of England was asked to conduct the court which choose the next king.

Participants
Combatants of the following nations and entities were involved in the Wars of Scottish Independence:
 Kingdom of England
 Kingdom of Scotland
 Lordship of Ireland
 Kingdom of France

Main conflicts and campaigns
The Wars of Scottish Independence consisted of the following conflicts:
 First War of Scottish Independence - 12961328
 English invasion of Scotland (1296)
 Bruce campaign in Ireland - 13151318
 Second War of Scottish Independence - 13321357

Notable agreements
The following agreements all had a bearing on the conduct of the Wars of Scottish Independence:
 Ragman Rolls - Series of agreements whereby the Scottish nobles subscribed to the allegiance of Edward I of England. Signed in 1291, 1292 and 1296.
 Auld Alliance - Agreement made in 1295 between the Kingdom of Scotland and the Kingdom of France against the Kingdom of England.
 Declaration of Arbroath - Letter sent to Pope John XXII in 1320 asserting Scotland's independence.
 Treaty of Edinburgh–Northampton - 1328 treaty formally ending the First War of Scottish Independence.
 Treaty of Berwick (1357) - Formally ended the Second War of Scottish Independence.

Notable individuals

Leaders in Scotland

Kings
 John Balliol - 12921296
 Robert the Bruce - 13061329
 David II of Scotland - 13291371

Guardians

Interregnum period
The following people all served as the Guardian of Scotland, either solely or jointly during the interregnum of 12961306:
 William Wallace - 12971298
 Andrew Moray - 12971298
 Robert the Bruce - 12981300
 John Comyn III of Badenoch - 12981304
 William de Lamberton - 12991301
 Ingram de Umfraville - 13001301
 John de Soules - 13011304

Minority of David II
The following people all served as the Guardian of Scotland, during the minority of David II of Scotland:
 Thomas Randolph, 1st Earl of Moray - 13291332
 Domhnall II, Earl of Mar - 1332
 Andrew Murray - 1332, 13351338
 Robert II of Scotland - 13341335, 13381341. Would serve again when David II was captured by the English from 13471354.

Leaders in England

Kings
 Edward I of England - 12721307
 Edward II of England - 13071327
 Edward III of England - 13271377

Other leaders
 Edward Balliol - Claimant to the Scottish throne. Would claim to rule from 13321356.

See also
 Anglo-Scottish Wars
 List of battles between Scotland and England

External links

BBC.com: The Wars of Scottish Independence
Historynet.com: Wars of Scottish Independence: Battle of Bannockburn
Syelander.org: Battles of Dupplin Moor, Halidon Hill, & Neville's Cross

 
13th century in Scotland
14th century in Scotland
13th-century conflicts
14th-century conflicts
Warfare in medieval Scotland
Wars involving Scotland
Wars involving England
Scottish
Invasions by England
Invasions of Scotland
Military history of England
Military history of Scotland
Warfare of the Middle Ages
England–Scotland relations
Wikipedia outlines